The Hartley V8 engine is a series of a four-stroke naturally-aspirated DOHC V8 engines, designed, developed and built by John Hartley and Hartley Enterprises, which has been produced since 2004. It was famously used in the well-known Ariel Atom 500 V8 sports car model.

References

Automobile engines
Internal combustion piston engines
V8 engines
Gasoline engines by model
Engines by model